Carl Hepple is a British multi-sport Paralympic athlete. In the 1960 Summer Paralympics he competed in multiple sports including archery, athletics and wheelchair basketball. In the 1980s, Carl also competed in shooting. In 1968, he was part of the British men's wheelchair basketball team which finished third.

References

Archers at the 1960 Summer Paralympics
Athletes (track and field) at the 1960 Summer Paralympics
Athletes (track and field) at the 1968 Summer Paralympics
Shooters at the 1984 Summer Paralympics
Shooters at the 1988 Summer Paralympics
Wheelchair basketball players at the 1964 Summer Paralympics
Wheelchair basketball players at the 1968 Summer Paralympics
Wheelchair basketball players at the 1972 Summer Paralympics
Paralympic bronze medalists for Great Britain
Living people
Year of birth missing (living people)
Medalists at the 1960 Summer Paralympics
Medalists at the 1968 Summer Paralympics
Paralympic medalists in athletics (track and field)
Paralympic athletes of Great Britain
Paralympic archers of Great Britain
Paralympic wheelchair basketball players of Great Britain
Paralympic medalists in wheelchair basketball
Paralympic medalists in archery
Wheelchair javelin throwers
Paralympic javelin throwers